Ashur-rabi I was a king of Assyria in the 15th century BC. The son of the former king Enlil-nasir I, he seized the throne after a successful coup against Ashur-shaduni, who had been the king for only one month.

Notes

References

15th-century BC Assyrian kings
Leaders who took power by coup
Year of birth unknown

Year of death unknown